Uno-ike Dam  is an earthfill dam located in Kagawa Prefecture in Japan. The dam is used for irrigation. The catchment area of the dam is 0.2 km2. The dam impounds about 9  ha of land when full and can store 337 thousand cubic meters of water.

See also
List of dams in Japan

References

Dams in Kagawa Prefecture